Andrei Yuryevich Solomatin (born 9 September 1975) is a Russian football manager and a former player.

Club career
He played mostly for Lokomotiv Moskva and CSKA Moskva.

International
He played 13 matches for the Russian national team and was a participant at the 2002 FIFA World Cup.

Honours
Lokomotiv Moscow
Russian Premier League: 2003
Russian Cup: 1995–96, 1996–97, 1999–2000, 2000–01

CSKA Moscow
Russian Cup: 2001–02

International goals
Results list Russia's goal tally first.

External links

References

1975 births
Living people
Association football defenders
Russian footballers
Russian expatriate footballers
Russia international footballers
Russia national football B team footballers
Russia under-21 international footballers
Expatriate footballers in Ukraine
Expatriate footballers in South Korea
FC Torpedo Moscow players
FC Lokomotiv Moscow players
PFC CSKA Moscow players
FC Kuban Krasnodar players
Seongnam FC players
FC Obolon-Brovar Kyiv players
PFC Krylia Sovetov Samara players
FC Anzhi Makhachkala players
Russian Premier League players
Ukrainian Premier League players
K League 1 players
2002 FIFA World Cup players
Footballers from Moscow
Russian football managers
FC FShM Torpedo Moscow players
FC Spartak Nizhny Novgorod players